Ma Li (1916–1979) was a Chinese politician. He was born in Ji County, Tianjin. He was Communist Party of China Committee Secretary and governor of Guizhou Province.

1916 births
1979 deaths
People's Republic of China politicians from Tianjin
Chinese Communist Party politicians from Tianjin
Governors of Guizhou
Political office-holders in Guizhou
Vice-governors of Hebei